East Point is a suburban city located southwest of Atlanta in Fulton County, Georgia, United States. As of the 2020 census, the city had a population of 38,358. The city name is derived from being at the opposite end of the former Atlanta & West Point Railroad from West Point.

History
The name "East Point" derives from the fact that this is the terminus of the Atlanta & West Point Railroad in the east; West Point, Georgia, is the terminus where the rail line ends in the west.

This settlement was founded as a railroad terminus with 16 families in 1870, but grew quickly after it became an inviting place for industry to develop. Soon it boasted the railway, two gristmills, and a government distillery located on Connally Drive. One of the earliest buildings was the factory of the White Hickory Manufacturing Company, built by B.M. Blount and L.M. Hill (who became the first chairman of the board of aldermen of the city).

By 1880 the town had two churches, a common school, a steam-cotton gin, a sawmill, a post office (founded in 1851), a telegraph office and its own newspaper weekly, The Plow Boy. East Point ranked as a grain and cotton-growing center. With its pleasant upland climate and proximity to the railway, it was a popular summer resort for people from the city of Atlanta.

In 1884 the first telephone rang in East Point, and in 1887 the city received its first charter. In 1890 a major portion of property along East Point Avenue was subdivided and developed, opening the way for more homes, more churches, more people, and more places of employment. By 1892 Main Street was completed, despite protests from a few progress-shy early settlers who maintained that one major thoroughfare, Newnan Road, was more than sufficient.

By the start of the 20th century, the adolescent town was poised to grow into the city it eventually would become.

In late 2015 and early 2016, some scenes for the Netflix series Stranger Things were filmed at the exterior of the First Baptist Church (standing in for a hospital exterior in a fictional Indiana town).

Government and infrastructure
The city has a city council-city manager form of government, with a professional city manager hired by the council. The manager is approved by the eight-member city council, headed by the mayor who has veto power. The city is divided into four wards (A, B, C, & D), each electing two city council members.

In the late 20th century, East Point suffered a loss of jobs due to railroad and industrial restructuring. In the first quarter of the 21st century, its economy has expanded, and new businesses and residences have been developed around the city. The relatively new Camp Creek Marketplace, for example, boasts 718,590 sq. ft. of retail space, with new businesses moving in regularly. Several Fortune 500 companies call it home. In December 2007, the city's newest multiplex opened.

The National Archives regional repository for data collected by the U.S. Census was originally located in the Colonial Hills area of East Point. It was moved to a new facility in nearby Morrow.

The Federal Bureau of Prisons Southeast Region Office is in East Point.

Transit systems
MARTA heavy rail subway and bus lines serve the city.

East Point Historic Civic Block

The East Point Historic Civic Block consists of three historically significant buildings and one memorial park in downtown East Point. It is located within the parameters of East Point Street, Linwood Avenue, Church Street, and West Cleveland Avenue.  The City Hall, City Auditorium, New Deal Library, and Victory Park make up the Civic Block, which since 2011 has been the focus of both redevelopment interest and historic preservation efforts.

Sports and recreation

East Point is served by Sumner Park, Sykes Park, Brookdale Park, Grayson Field, Jefferson Park, John Milner Park and Chris Stacks Field.

The city boasts of producing several notable athletes, among them Reggie Rutland, Jonas Jennings (NFL), Nick Rogers (NFL), Bill Thorn, Donald Adams (Basketball), John Milner (baseball) and Jay Hudson.

When the Dick Lane Velodrome was built in 1974, it was one of only two in the United States. Named after a longtime City Council member, the Velodrome was inspired by a facility seen by a group of residents and city officials who visited the Munich Olympics in 1972. The Velodrome is a 1/5 mile and 36° banked concrete track for bicycle racing, set in Sumner park in a residential part of historic East Point. Dick Lane is the only velodrome in the world with a green space that contains a large oak tree and a creek running through the in-field. It is located eight miles south of downtown Atlanta.

The City of East Point owns the velodrome and has a long-term partnership with the East Point Velodrome Association (EPVA) to manage it. The EPVA is a 100% volunteer-based 501(c)3 nonprofit organization dedicated to the rehabilitation, care and growth of the Dick Lane Velodrome. The EPVA conducts Youth Service Activities for children at no cost to the city or state. These activities include the Bicycle Little League (for kids 8–12), summer camps (kids 13–16), and bicycle safety clinics. In addition to raising bicycle safety awareness, these programs promote physical health and wellness, teamwork, and individual growth through the sport, and positive alternatives to drugs and gangs. These pioneering grass-root programs are intended to build the base of competitive cycling in the U.S. EPVA hosts three professional-level events annually, held in May, July and September; these are part of the American Track Racing Association National Championship Series.

Geography
It is bordered to the north, east, and west by the city of Atlanta, to the southeast by Hapeville, and to the south by College Park.

Demographics

2020 census

As of the 2020 United States census, there were 38,358 people, 14,216 households, and 6,721 families residing in the city.

2000 census
As of the census of 2000, there were 39,595 people, 14,553 households, and 9,430 families residing in the city. The racial makeup of the city was 78.16% African American, 16.10% White, 0.20% Native American, 0.62% Asian, 0.09% Pacific Islander, 3.40% from other races, and 1.42% from two or more races. Hispanic or Latino of any race were 7.57% of the population.

There were 14,553 households there in 2000, out of which 34.5% had children under the age of 18 living with them, 28.7% were married couples living together, 28.9% had a female householder with no husband present, and 35.2% were non-families. 27.4% of all households were made up of individuals, and 5.5% had someone living alone who was 65 years of age or older.  The average household size was 2.69 and the average family size was 3.27.

In the city, the population was spread out, with 29.3% under the age of 18, 11.9% from 18 to 24, 31.3% from 25 to 44, 19.5% from 45 to 64, and 7.9% who were 65 years of age or older.  The median age was 30 years. For every 100 females, there were 89.5 males.  For every 100 females age 18 and over, there were 84.8 males.

The median income for a household in the city was $31,874, and the median income for a family was $36,099. Males had a median income of $27,114 versus $25,839 for females. The per capita income for the city was $15,175.  About 17.2% of families and 20.7% of the population were below the poverty line, including 30.0% of those under age 18 and 13.6% of those age 65 or over.

Education

Primary and secondary schools
The Fulton County School System operates the area's public schools.

Elementary schools in East Point and serving sections of East Point include Brookview, Conley Hills,
Asa G. Hilliard, Hamilton E. Holmes, and Parklane.

Elementary schools outside of East Point serving sections of East Point include College Park in College Park, Seaborn Lee Elementary School in South Fulton.

Hilliard Elementary, named after former East Point resident Asa Grant Hilliard III, opened in 2016 on the site of the former Mount Olive Elementary School, which opened in 1960. Mount Olive was replaced by Hilliard, with the former building razed in 2014.

Middle schools serving sections of city include Paul D. West Middle School and Woodland Middle School, both in East Point. A portion is zoned to Camp Creek Middle School in South Fulton, and another to Sandtown Middle School.

Most of the city is zoned to Tri-Cities High School in East Point.  Some of the city is zoned to Westlake High School in South Fulton, and Banneker High School.

The former Oak Knoll Elementary building, since 2015, houses RISE Grammar School/RISE Prep School (which together serve K-8), which purchased the facility for $1.73 million in May 2018.

Higher education
Point University, formerly Atlanta Christian College, has a location in East Point. Though the university's traditional students are transitioning to West Point, Georgia in Fall 2012, the East Point location will remain active for the school's adult studies program.

Public libraries
Atlanta–Fulton Public Library System operates the East Point Branch.

References

External links

 City of East Point official website
 East Point Police Department
 East Point Historical Society
 East Point Main Street Association
 East Point hotel and visitor guide
 Center Park Neighborhood Association
 Hillcrest Cemetery Memorial Association
 Dick Lane Velodrome
 East Point historical marker

Cities in Georgia (U.S. state)
Cities in Fulton County, Georgia
East Point
Populated places established in 1870
1870 establishments in Georgia (U.S. state)